is a Japanese manga series by Bino, serialized online via Niconico Seiga, Comic Newtype, and pixiv Comic websites since 2014. It has been collected in ten tankōbon volumes by Kadokawa Shoten as of December 2022. An anime television series adaptation by Passione aired from July to September 2019. A live-action series aired on TV Asahi from January to March 2020.

On June 9, 2021, it was announced the manga would go on a hiatus after the author Bino gave birth to her first child. The manga resumed on December 24, 2021.

Characters
The names and nicknames of all the characters are puns and allusions to the central "quirk" of their personality. For example, the name Lily is a hint of a lilies, whose Japanese title "yuri" is also used to refer to lesbian love in Japanese pop culture. 

 Portrayed by: Yui Okada (2020 drama)
The central character and an incredibly stupid girl. Her stupidity and annoying behavior is so remarkable that even close friends call her "Baka", which means "idiot" in Japanese.

 Portrayed by: Yuri Tsunematsu (2020 drama)
An aspiring manga artist and a fan of yaoi media. It is implied that she is developing feelings for her teacher Waseda, but is in denial about it. She also listens to the music of the Vocaloid producer Teishotoku-P, who unbeknownst to her is actually someone she knows.

 Portrayed by: Yurika Nakamura (2020 drama)
An emotionless smart girl who aspires to be a microbiologist. She is childhood friends with Baka and Wota, whom she met while in elementary school. She went to the same junior high school as Majime.

 Portrayed by: Mei Hata (2020 drama)
A short girl who looks like a primary school student. Her appearance is ironically combined with her childhood innocence, which is why Loli is constantly becoming a victim of "adult" misunderstandings. She lives with her grandmother as her parents are working overseas in Germany.

 Portrayed by: Momoko Fukuchi (2020 drama)
A girl with a chunibyo personality, who dyed her hair blond. She often speaks with Waseda regarding her thoughts and plans. 

 Portrayed by: Nana Asakawa (2020 drama)
Tomboy-ish shy girl who is incredibly popular with others because of her masculine appearance, but she herself doesn't notice it because of her social clumsiness. Thanks to her outstanding logical thinking, Majime is incredibly talented in mathematics, but at the same time completely ignorant in ordinary human relationships. For this reason, she admires Robo incredibly, who she considers equally smart and sociable.

 Portrayed by: Ayaka Imoto (2020 drama)
A student who rarely comes to school and who has an interest in the occult. She has a twin sister named Kohaku.

 Portrayed by: Yui Kobayashi (2020 drama)
A popular beauty and part-Austrian student who transferred to the school. Her role in the plot is a parody of lesbian characters, although it is unclear how much this is connected with her real sexuality or just phobia for men, which for some reason affects Tanaka too. One way or another, Lily becomes one of the most popular girls of their school, although her life is often complicated due to the quirks of other characters.

 Portrayed by: Keita Machida (2020 drama)
The class's homeroom teacher. He is only attracted to female university students. He also regularly has consultations with Yamai; a running gag involves his glasses breaking when Yamai mentions something regarding her chunibyo behavior. Outside of school, he is secretly a Vocaloid producer who goes by the name . 

 Portrayed by: Nazuna Iseri (2020 drama)

 Portrayed by: Noa Kita (2020 drama)
Majo's twin sister. Unlike her sister, she is the complete opposite.

A high school girl who has poor social skills. She lives alone due to a desire to own cats, which could not be done in her parents' residence. She also works part-time as a convenience store clerk.

A high school girl who is the daughter of a ramen shop owner. She is known in school for keeping a cute personality, and she also posts videos about fashion online. When she was in junior high school, she was frequently bullied for having an unattractive appearance. She then met Baka, who then gave her the nickname "Hime" and helped inspire Hime's father to improve their restaurant business, which was failing at the time.

 Portrayed by: Hikomaro (2020 drama)

Media

Manga
The manga series began serialization on the Comic Newtype website in 2014. It has been collected into ten tankōbon volumes as of December 9, 2022.

Anime
An anime television series adaptation was announced on November 1, 2018. The series was animated by Passione and directed by Hijiri Sanpei, with Takeo Takahashi as chief director, Masahiro Yokotani handling series composition, and Sachiko Yasuda designing the characters. Tomoki Kikuya composed the music. The series aired from July 5 to September 20, 2019 on AT-X, Tokyo MX, TVA, KBS, SUN, and BS11. Chinatsu Akasaki, Haruka Tomatsu, and Aki Toyosaki performed the series' opening theme song , as well as the series' ending theme song .

Drama
A live-action drama series premiered on TV Asahi on January 24, 2020. The series' theme song is "Starting Over" by Little Glee Monster.

Reception
Gadget Tsūshin listed both "interesting woman", a phrase from the first episode, and Yamai in their 2019 anime buzzwords list.

References

External links
 Wasteful Days of High School Girls at Comic Newtype 
  
 
 
 Drama official website 

2019 anime television series debuts
2020 Japanese television series debuts
Anime series based on manga
Japanese webcomics
Kadokawa Shoten manga
Kadokawa Dwango franchises
Passione (company)
Seinen manga
Sentai Filmworks
Webcomics in print
Japanese television dramas based on manga
TV Asahi television dramas
Muse Communication